Alstom Traxx (sold as Bombardier TRAXX before 2021) is a modular product platform of mainline diesel-electric and electric locomotives produced originally by Bombardier Transportation and later Alstom, which was built in both freight and passenger variants. The first version was a dual-voltage AC locomotive built for German railways from the year 2000. Later types included DC versions, as well as quadruple-voltage machines, able to operate on most European electrification schemes: 1.5/3.0 kV DC and 15/25 kV AC. The family was expanded in 2006 to include diesel-powered versions. Elements common to all variants include steel bodyshells, two bogies with two powered axles each, three-phase asynchronous induction motors, cooling exhausts on the roof edges, and wheel disc brakes.

The TRAXX brand name itself was introduced in 2003. The acronym stands for Transnational Railway Applications with eXtreme fleXibility. Locomotives were primarily made for the railways of Germany, with orders coming from other countries including France, Israel, Switzerland, Sweden, Norway, Italy, Belgium, Luxembourg, Poland, Spain, Hungary, South Africa and the Netherlands.

The TRAXX locomotives were developed at Bombardier plants in Mannheim, Zürich Oerlikon in Switzerland and Vado Ligure in Italy. The final assembly of the vehicles takes place at Bombardier's locomotive production centres at Kassel in Germany and Vado Ligure (only the DC Variant).

Development

AEG 12X, ABB Eco2000 platform

In the early 1990s, West German federal railway Deutsche Bundesbahn (DB) sought to replace its ageing electric locomotive fleet with a single type. In the previous decade, DB introduced its first universal locomotives with three-phase asynchronous induction motors and two bogies with two powered axles each, the DB Class 120, which had been successful. In 1991, DB requested bids for about 1000 more universal locomotives with an improved design and increased power, the planned DB Class 121. The railway industry began developing new locomotives, but in October 1992, DB cancelled the tender due to the high price of the offers and the changed situation. In 1994, Deutsche Bundesbahn merged with the former East German Deutsche Reichsbahn, creating Deutsche Bahn, bringing over 600 modern DR Class 243 locomotives into the joint locomotive fleet. In addition, the merger coincided with a railway reform, dividing the rolling stock of Deutsche Bahn between its regional passenger, long-distance passenger and freight business areas, making the universal locomotive plans obsolete. From late 1993, the business areas of Deutsche Bahn and their predecessors called new bids for electric locomotives tailored for their specific needs.

The competitors for the DB Class 121 included two of the forerunners of Bombardier Transportation: German locomotive manufacturer AEG Schienenfahrzeuge, a part of AEG which was controlled by Daimler-Benz at the time; and ABB Henschel, a German locomotive manufacturing branch of Swedish-Swiss company ABB. Components of both the AEG and ABB concepts were built into the prototypes of the DB Class 120 for trials from late 1991. AEG followed up its development effort by building an experimental universal locomotive, the 12X. This locomotive can be considered the predecessor of the TRAXX family. The 12X was delivered in June 1994 and, although owned by AEG, was designated Class 128 by DB. The locomotive also had a modular design, allowing the derivation of different versions for different operational needs, and thus it formed AEG's basis to compete for the new orders of Deutsche Bahn's business areas. Meanwhile, ABB developed its own design of a modular electric locomotive platform, the Eco2000 concept.

The 12X was later used as testbed for new technologies, becoming the first locomotive in the world with IGBT based converters in 1997 and testing the MITRAC traction control electronics from 1998. Both of these technologies would later find their commercial application in TRAXX locomotives.

DBAG Class 145 family, Adtranz Octeon platform

In November 1994, Deutsche Bahn chose ABB and AEG for two of its orders: ABB was to deliver 145 express locomotives for DB's long-distance business area DB Fernverkehr, the DB Class 101, while AEG was to supply DB's freight business area DB Cargo with eighty locomotives for medium-weight freight trains, the DBAG Class 145.

The original Class 145 design was a cheaper derivative of the 12X, omitting components for higher speeds, including hollow-shaft drives, which were replaced by simpler axle hung drives. In January 1996, ABB and Daimler-Benz merged their railway business areas into a joint venture, ADtranz. The final design of the locomotive was adapted for more commonalities with the DBAG Class 101. The biodegradable ester cooled inverters with GTO thyristors and the also ester cooled main transformer of the DBAG Class 145 was derived from those of the DBAG Class 101, but with less components for the lower maximum power, providing for individual bogie control rather than individual axle control. Due to the shared features, the Class 145 was sometimes described as a member of the Eco2000 family.

Adtranz rolled out the first Class 145 in July 1997. In addition, 17 identical locomotives were built for lease to private railways. A further six locomotives were built for the Swiss railway MittelThurgauBahn.

In March 1998, Adtranz announced its intent to consolidate its product range into seven modular product platforms. The electric locomotive platform with the brand name "Octeon" was to be based on Adtranz's newest types for Germany (the Class 145 and Class 101). Adtranz originally intended to introduce Octeon types alongside existing products, and applied the name to its new products outside Germany at the end of the nineties, like the FS Class E464 or the heavy-haul locomotive Iore. The GTO thyristor based converters of these locomotives were from the water-cooled Camilla family, which was developed by ABB as successor for the oil-cooled converters in the SBB-CFF-FFS Re 460. The Octeon brand name did not catch on and was abandoned when Bombardier acquired Adtranz in 2001.

Between 2000 and 2002, a version of the DBAG Class 145 for passenger trains, with hollow shaft final drive and a higher top speed of 160 km/h, was produced for DB's regional business area DB Regio. The top of the front of the carbodies was modified to provide space for a flip-disc display. These locomotives were given the designation DBAG Class 146.0.

Although the production of the DBAG Class 145 ended by the time Bombardier bought Adtranz in 2001, and even the production of the Class 146.0 locomotives ended by the time the TRAXX brand name was introduced in 2003, in Bombardier's own publications, the Class 145 was included in the TRAXX F140 AC, the Class 146.0 in the TRAXX P160 AC type. The still in-production FS Class E464 got the designation TRAXX P160 DCP, while TRAXX H80 AC was applicable to the Iore class, however, these then still in production types were excluded from the TRAXX family in publications after 2007.

DBAG Class 185 family, Bombardier TRAXX platform

In July 1998, Adtranz received a follow-on order for 400 more locomotives for medium-weight freight trains, the DBAG Class 185. The double voltage Class 185 was meant for international operation, and was also dubbed Europalok. The basic concept of the running gear, the axle hung motors, the ester cooled inverters and transformer was maintained from the Class 145. In addition to the electronics for double voltage operation, modifications included the provision for the installation of the full variety of train protection systems in use in Europe, and the lowering of the roof by 105 mm to fit the vehicle in the international UIC 505-1 loading gauge.

In 2001 Bombardier bought Adtranz, thus acquiring locomotive building technology. Under Bombardier, the Class 185 was developed into a family like that of the Class 145, with private railway and passenger (DBAG Class 146.1) versions. In May 2003, Bombardier also received an order for a quadruple system version from the Swiss Federal Railways (SBB).

In September 2003, Bombardier gave the Class 185 family a brand name, TRAXX, intended to allude to the terms 'traction', 'track' and 'attraction'. The acronym stands for Transnational Railway Applications with eXtreme fleXibility. The first letter of TRAXX type designations provides for differentiation according to the area of application, with F for freight and P for passenger. The original system also tentatively included H for heavy-haul and S for high-speed, but no actual vehicles were delivered under this designation. The number following the first letter indicates the top speed of the locomotive in kilometers per hour. The next two letters indicate the supply system, with AC for alternating current electric locomotives, DC for direct current electric locomotives, MS for multi-system locomotives capable of operating both under AC and DC overhead wires, and DE was foreseen from the start for an eventual Diesel-electric version. An extra P letter at the end was to designate powerheads (traction heads), that is locomotives with one driving cabin for push-pull operation. An also optional number at the end designates different versions, later used for the designation of generations.

In the new system, the factory designation of the DBAG Class 185 and its sisters with other railways became TRAXX F140 AC, that of the DBAG Class 146.1 TRAXX P160 AC, and that of the planned quadruple voltage SBB locomotive TRAXX F140 MS.

When Bombardier introduced the first TRAXX 2 types, the original family was also designated TRAXX 1, and the number 1 was added at the end of the type designation of first-generation locomotives still in delivery.

TRAXX 2 and TRAXX 2E platforms
In 2004, the basic TRAXX design was subjected to a major overhaul, with the carbody and the front redesigned to suit current crashworthiness standards, and the replacement of GTO thyristor based inverters with IGBT based inverters. The option of individual axle control in place of individual bogie control was also introduced. The coolant of the inverters and the main transformer was also changed from ester to water. The carbody design was completely standardised, by default providing a space for the mounting of a flip-disc display above the windshield, which is covered by a non-structural hood in freight versions. The bogie frame was strengthened, to allow an increase of axle loads to 22 tons. This generation of the family is also referred to as the TRAXX 2 platform, and is sometimes also indicated with a number 2 at the end of the type designations.

The TRAXX carbody design and internal configuration was modified again in 2006 when the first actual Diesel-electric version was built, to provide the same layout for Diesel and electric versions. In the electric versions, the central location of the diesel engine was used for the AC transformer or the DC chokes. The weight of the component at the central location is supported on a horizontal mounting plate that fits onto the main frame using the same fixtures. This generation of the family is also referred to as the TRAXX 2E platform, the type designations themselves didn't change. The TRAXX 2E generation also included the first actual deliveries of the DC versions of the TRAXX platform. The AC version of the TRAXX 2 remained in production in parallel with the 2E versions of other types.

Traxx Africa
In March 2014 Transnet ordered 240 dual-voltage  Traxx Africa locomotives, to be built in South Africa. The first locomotive was handed over to Transnet in December 2017, with revenue service planned to begin early in 2018. This model's appearance more closely resembles its predecessors than the European TRAXX.

Production
All Traxx locomotives are assembled and tested at Alstom's (originally Bombardier) plant in Kassel Germany, except the DC only versions which are assembled at Vado Ligure and some RENFE Class 253, which have been assembled by RENFE in its shop in Villaverde (Madrid).

The individual components are sourced from a variety of sites:
 Traction and auxiliary converters (inverters): Alstom, Mannheim, Trapaga Spain
 Bogies: Alstom, Siegen
 Driver desks: Alstom Hennigsdorf, Alstom Kassel
 Locomotive bodies and frames: Alstom, Wroclaw (Poland)
 Cooling components: Behr GmbH & Co, Stuttgart
 Brakes: Knorr, Munich
 Transformer: ABB Sécheron, Geneva (Switzerland)
 Climate control systems (heating, humidity, etc.): Liebherr in Korneburg (Austria)

TRAXX dual voltage AC versions
{{Infobox locomotive
|name             = TRAXX F140 AC / P160 ACTRAXX F140 AC2
|powertype        = Electric
|image            =DB 185 001-5.jpg
|imagesize        =250px
|caption          =TRAXX F140 AC, DB Class 185
|builder          =
|ordernumber      =
|serialnumber     =
|buildmodel       =
|builddate        =F140 AC / P160 AC : 1999-January 2006TRAXX F140 AC2 / P160 AC2 :
|totalproduction  =F140 AC1: 312P140 AC1: 20P160 AC1: 42Total: 377F140 AC2 : 300+P160 AC2 : 68Grand Total : 745+|rebuilder        =
|rebuilddate      =
|numberrebuilt    =
|aarwheels        =
|uicclass         =
|gauge            =
|trucks           =
|bogies           =
|wheeldiameter    =
|minimumcurve     =
|wheelbase        =
|length           =
|width            =
|height           =
|axleload         =
|weightondrivers  =
|locoweight       =
|sandcap          =
|powersupply      =
|electricsystem   = 15 kV 16⅔ Hz AC, 25 kV/50 Hz ACCatenary
|collectionmethod = Pantograph
|alternator       =
|generator        =
|tractionmotors   =
|transmission     =
|multipleworking  =
|maxspeed         =F140 AC / F 140 AC2 : P160 AC : P140 AC (for CFL) : 
|poweroutput      =
|tractiveeffort   =TRAXX F140 AC - Switzerland (SBB)  bombardier.com  
|factorofadhesion =
|trainheating     =
|locobrakes       =
|locobrakeforce   =
|trainbrakes      =
|safety           =
|operator         =
|operatorclass    =
|powerclass       =
|numinclass       =
|fleetnumbers     =
|officialname     =
|nicknames        =
|axleloadclass    =
|locale           =
|deliverydate     =
|firstrundate     =
|lastrundate      =
|retiredate       =
|withdrawndate    =
|preservedunits   =
|restoredate      =
|scrapdate        =
|currentowner     =
|disposition      =
}}

TRAXX F140 AC

The TRAXX F140 AC operates on AC overhead lines. They can work under both the 15 kV/16.7 Hz and the 25 kV/50 Hz AC systems. As built they are configured for future ETCS / ERTMS train control and safety systems.

The 200 units built between 2001 and 2003 for Deutsche Bahn were classified as DBAG Class 185, or DBAG Class 185.1 once production switched to the TRAXX F140 AC2 design. A further 57 units were built for various European leasing companies, and were classified in Germany as Class 185.5.

Another 35 units were produced for the freight business area of the Swiss Federal Railways, SBB Cargo (SBB Re482), and 20 units for Swiss private railway BLS AG (BLS Re485). The Swiss locomotives differ from the German versions in details such as pantographs (2 more, with smaller contacts for running under Swiss catenary (not because of tunnels)) and Switzerland specific safety systems in addition to the German systems.

TRAXX P140 AC

In Luxembourg CFL operates 20 locomotives.

TRAXX P160 AC
The TRAXX P160 AC is the passenger version of this class, with a correspondingly higher top speed of 160 km/h. A lower unsprung mass was achieved by using hollow shaft final drives instead of the axle hung motor arrangement of the 140 km/h maximum speed versions. The bogies and drive unit are the same as used in the DBAG Class 146.0.

In Germany, DB Regio acquired 32 units between 2003 and 2005, where they are designated DBAG Class 146.1.

Additionally, (Landesnahverkehrsgesellschaft Niedersachsen mbH (LVNG), (Hannover) ) has 10 units which are leased to the railway company metronom (operating as ME146).

TRAXX F140 AC2

The first AC member of the TRAXX 2 family, which featured carbodies with improved crashworthiness and water-cooled IGBT-based inverters, was the demonstrator loco 185 561, delivered in May 2004. It was produced ahead of the main tranche of TRAXX F140 AC2 locomotives for homologation of the class in Germany.

Another demonstrator TRAXX F140 AC2, 185 568 was used for tests on the then new HSL-Zuid in 2006. Subsequently, it was used for tests of the ETCS system.

Both demonstrator locomotives were eventually sold to private operators for normal use.

The remaining 200 of the 400 Class 185 freight locomotives ordered for DB Cargo were to be of this type, and the new versions were given the subclass designation DBAG Class 185.2. Since this large order represented the main body of production at Bombardier's Kassel plant, any further private orders for the AC locomotives would be included into the F140AC2 production line - thus the original F140 AC type effectively ceased production when the production of DB Cargo's (by then renamed Railion) Class 185.2 began.

The locomotives operated by SBB Cargo are designated Re482.2.

TRAXX P160 AC2

Alongside the F140 AC2 locomotives, the passenger versions received the same improvements. DB Regio received 47 units between 2005 and 2006; as with the freight version the '.2' subclass was used to distinguish these new versions - the Deutsche Bahn locomotives being classified as Class 146.2, following on from the Class 146. A number of smaller orders have been received, including more units for the metronom railway - procured via LNVG. DB Fernverkehr, the German Railways branch which operates Intercity services, ordered 27 more Class 146.2 locos on 12 January 2011. The locos will start service in December 2013.

Operators and leasing companies

As of 2010, production of the AC2 versions is still ongoing, with the DB Schenker order expected to be completed in late 2009. Along with German companies the AC locomotives have orders from Scandinavian countries and from Hungary – where the Hungarian State railways (MÁV) (Magyar Államvasutak) has placed an order for 25 (and optional 25) P160 AC2 machines.

TRAXX AC/DC versions

TRAXX F140 MS

The first multi-system TRAXX unit that could operate under AC and DC electrified catenaries, SBB Re484 001, was introduced at the same time 185 561 was introduced as demonstrator locomotive for the F140 AC2 type. In addition to the 15 kV/16.7 Hz and 25 kV/50 Hz AC supplies, the new model could also be operated under 3 kV DC overhead electrification. Later models also supported a 1.5 kV DC supply. This locomotive for SBB was also the first TRAXX variant with individual axle control in place of individual bogie control. The general type name given by Bombardier was TRAXX F140 MS.

Apart from the different pantographs, electrical systems for DC operation, the F140 MS types are identical to the contemporary dual voltage versions. However, under 1.5 kV DC, the maximum available power is limited to 4.0 MW, although this does not affect the maximum tractive effort, which is limited by other factors. As a consequence of the additional equipment required, the locomotives weigh approximately 1 tonne more than their dual voltage relatives.

The locomotives are designed for cross border operations; the addition of 1.5 kV and 3 kV DC operability potentially allows the locomotives to operate in Poland and Italy. In practice the delivered locomotives were used for work into Switzerland and Italy, and equipped with either the Italian safety system SCMT or ETCS.

Post 2006 many more of these multi-system locomotives were produced, this time with some for use in the Benelux countries, as well as France and Poland, with further units being produced for Swiss/Italian traffic. In Poland, locomotives used by PKP Cargo have been designated as the EU43 class. Units hired from Alpha Trains cargo to SNCB (Belgium) have also received the class number SNCB Class 28

In July 2018, Bombardier introduced the third generation of TRAXX multi-system locomotives, named the MS3, which in addition to carrying over compatibility with the four electrification systems introduced an onboard engine to enable travel over short distances of non-electrified track.

TRAXX DC versions

Once Bombardier completed the first TRAXX F140 MS, a single-voltage version for DC overhead wires could be produced cost effectively by leaving away the AC equipment of a multi-system locomotive, and Bombardier began seeking a launch customer in 2004. In 2005, Angel Trains (today Alpha Trains) placed an order for 10 DC electric locomotives with Bombardier. The first machine, designated E483 001, was produced in August 2006 at Bombardier's plant in Kassel.

Later machines were built at Bombardier's plant in Vado Ligure in Italy, which has become the official site for production of DC versions of the TRAXX locomotives.

The weight of the TRAXX F140 DC is slightly reduced compared to the AC machines which require a particularly heavy high-voltage transformer for use with the low 16.7 Hz frequency of the 15 kV AC system.
The machines are built to the same specifications as the rest of the TRAXX family, but only have equipment for 3 kV DC - making them suitable for internal work in Italy, Spain and Poland. If necessary the machines can be rebuilt for multi-system use.

Renfe Mercancías, the freight division of Renfe Operadora ordered 100 locomotives for freight use to be designated RENFE Class 253; these are the first TRAXX locomotives to be built to anything other than standard gauge.

Additionally Trenitalia has ordered 42 locomotives for freight use, which will be operated at up to 160 km/h.

TRAXX diesel versions

The diesel version of the TRAXX platform was introduced with the 2E version of the TRAXX platform. In the diesel version, the fuel tank occupies the same space as the transformer in the electric versions, centrally and below the main frame members. Installed motor power is 2.2MW. The diesel and electric TRAXX locomotives share the same driver cabin and control desk, body, bogies, and drive system. The maximum tractive effort is slight reduced by 30 kN to 270 kN due to the lower power of the diesel engine.

The first order for the diesel passenger version (designated as Class 246, Bombardier's designation TRAXX P160 DE) came from metronom via the leasing company LNVG.  The company already used TRAXX electric locomotives and required locomotives for the non-electrified Hamburg-Cuxhaven line. 11 locomotives were ordered in 2005, delivery would take place in 2007. The first three engines were built in 2006 for type certification, with one machine being presented officially at the InnoTrans 2006 railfair; they were in service by late 2007.

Leasing company CBrail was the first to order the freight version (as Class 285, Bombardier's designation TRAXX F140 DE) in 2006, the first locomotive was delivery in mid-2007, and had been certified for use by 2008. On 5 December 2008, SNCF Fret placed an order for 45 TRAXX F140 DE locomotives, the order being valued at 160 million Euros. The class are to be designated as SNCF Class BB 476000. The contract includes an option for a further 35 locomotives.

In April 2011 DB Regio awarded Bombardier a framework agreement for up to 200 Traxx DE Multi-Engine locomotives worth a total of €600m; an initial 20 locomotives will be delivered from mid-2013 at a cost of €62m. These genset locomotives will have four  diesel engines in place of one large engine, with the aim of reducing fuel consumption and exhaust emissions because the engines can be shut down when not needed.

TRAXX dual-mode version
On 10 May 2011, Bombardier announced a new TRAXX electro-diesel model, dubbed the "Last Mile Diesel", that combined a standard AC propulsion system with a diesel engine to power the locomotive in light-duty applications such as operating on non-electrified sidings or yards. The design was based on Bombardier's experience with building the ALP-45DP. At the time the new model was introduced, a launch order for five units was announced by Railpool, which had signed the order in late 2010.

See also

A number of other locomotives built by Bombardier have been derived from or share some technical features with the TRAXX platform:
 DBAG Class 101 - ABB-ordered, Adtranz-built express locomotive with electronics similar to that of early TRAXX locomotives except for individual axle control
 FS Class E412 - DC locomotive built at Vado Ligure works, first-delivered member of the Eco2000 family
 FS Class E464 - single cabin Italian locomotive also built at Vado Ligure
 Iore - twin section heavy-haul twin locomotive with three axles per bogie and a 30 t axle load
 AVE Class 102 - Spanish manufacturer Talgo's Talgo350 high-speed trains for Spanish railways RENFE, with powerheads made by a consortium led by Adtranz/Bombardier
 ALP-46 - built for New Jersey Transit, based on the DBAG Class 101
 ALP-46A - also being built for NJ Transit, based on the ALP-46 and the TRAXX 2E
 ALP-45DP electro-diesel locomotive - also being built for Montreal's AMT and New York-area commuter hauler NJ Transit, based on the ALP-46A
 List of České dráhy locomotive classes

Notes

References

Sources
 Bombardier Transportation bombardier.com
 Railcolor - modern locomotive Power!  Website about post 1990s European mainline electric and diesel locomotives railcolor.net

External links

 Drehstromloks.de - A comprehensive site about TRAXX and other Neubaulok series (German)
 High quality gallery of TRAXX family @ Trainspo

 
Standard gauge locomotives of Austria
Standard gauge locomotives of Belgium
Standard gauge locomotives of Denmark
Standard gauge locomotives of France
Standard gauge locomotives of Germany
Standard gauge locomotives of Hungary
Standard gauge locomotives of Italy
Standard gauge locomotives of Luxembourg
Standard gauge locomotives of the Netherlands
Standard gauge locomotives of Norway
Standard gauge locomotives of Poland
Standard gauge locomotives of Romania
Standard gauge locomotives of Sweden
Standard gauge locomotives of Switzerland
5 ft 6 in gauge locomotives
Railway locomotives introduced in 1996
Diesel-electric locomotives
Electric locomotives
Diesel-electric locomotives of Germany
Multi-system locomotives